Vadaktai   is a small town in Šiauliai County in northern-central Lithuania. As of 2011 it had a population of 178.

References

This article was initially translated from the Lithuanian Wikipedia.

Towns in Lithuania
Towns in Šiauliai County